is a pop song by the Japanese duo and idol unit ClariS, written by Kelly. It was released as the unit's sixteenth single on April 26, 2017 by Sacra Music. The song was used as the opening theme to the 2017 anime series Eromanga Sensei. It reached number 9 on Japan's weekly Oricon singles chart, and number 13 on Japan Hot 100.

Release and reception
On 10 February 2017, the musical duo ClariS announced at their "ClariS 1st Budōkan Concert ~Futatsu no Kamen to Ushinawareta Taiyō~" (ClariS 1st Budōkan Concert: Two Masks and the Lost Sun) on Friday that they would perform the opening theme song to the 2017 anime series Eromanga Sensei, titled "Hitorigoto" . The song was released  on 26 April 2017 on three edition; Regular edition, Limited edition and Limited anime edition. The single reached number 9 on Oricon, 13 on Japan Hot 100, and 3 on Japan Hot Animation with spent 13, 10 and 11 weeks respectively. In June 2017, "Hitorigoto" was certified gold by the Recording Industry Association of Japan (RIAJ) for 100,000 full-track ringtone digital music downloads (Chaku Uta Full). The song was featured in their fifth album "Fairy Party".

Music video
The music video for "Hitorigoto" was directed by Mitsugu Matsumoto. The video shows Clara and Karen singing and dancing in the shadow. Some scene show them doing the things normally, like eat a cake, drink a tea, and playing with some miniatures of the nature like a tree, a grass, and a butterfly. Also, some scene show some miniatures like a rabbit, a cloud, an air balloon, and a horse. The video ends in the scene that show where Clara and Karen doing the things normally, with some miniatures of carnival show in the table.

Track listing

Personnel
ClariS
Clara – vocals
Karen – vocals

Additional musicians
Yoichiro Nomura – music arranger
Atsushi Yuasa - music arranger
Chiaki Nagasawa - music arranger
Saori Nagano - music arranger

Production
Takashi Koiwa – mixer
Yuji Chinone – mastering

Charts

Certifications

Release history

Notes

References

2017 singles
2017 songs
ClariS songs
Anime songs
Animated series theme songs